Rony Talukdar (born 10 October 1990) is a batsman who plays first-class cricket for Dhaka Division in Bangladesh. He was part of Bangladesh's squad for the Under-19 World Cup in 2008.

Personal Life
Born and raised in a Hindu family at Narayanganj district of Bangladesh.

Career
In the first three matches of the 2014-15 first-class season, opening the batting for Dhaka Division, he scored 227, 163 and 201 in three innings victories, sharing opening stands of 197, 314 and 301 with Abdul Mazid.

He made his Twenty20 International debut against South Africa on 7 July 2015.

In October 2018, he was named in the squad for the Dhaka Dynamites team, following the draft for the 2018–19 Bangladesh Premier League. He was the leading run-scorer for Dhaka Division in the 2018–19 National Cricket League, with 426 runs in four matches. He was the also the leading run-scorer for East Zone in the tournament, with 460 runs in six matches. In November 2019, he was selected to play for the Sylhet Thunder in the 2019–20 Bangladesh Premier League.

In November 2022, he was named in the Rangpur Riders' squad, following the draft for the 2022–23 Bangladesh Premier League. In the second match of the tournament, on 6 January 2023, he smashed 67 runs off just 31 balls, helping Rangpur Riders to start their season with a convincing 34-run victory over the Comilla Victorians. He reached his fifty off just 19 balls, which is the fastest half-century by a Bangladeshi batter in the history of Bangladesh Premier League.

Notes

References

External links
 

Living people
Bangladeshi Hindus
Bangladeshi cricketers
Bangladesh Twenty20 International cricketers
Barisal Division cricketers
Dhaka Division cricketers
Asian Games medalists in cricket
Cricketers at the 2010 Asian Games
Fortune Barishal cricketers
Prime Doleshwar Sporting Club cricketers
Bangladesh Central Zone cricketers
Bangladesh under-23 cricketers
Bangladesh A cricketers
Rajshahi Royals cricketers
Dhaka Dominators cricketers
Asian Games gold medalists for Bangladesh
Medalists at the 2010 Asian Games
People from Narayanganj District
South Asian Games gold medalists for Bangladesh
South Asian Games medalists in cricket
1990 births